Paszport Polityki (Polityka's Passport) is an annual  Polish cultural award presented by the weekly magazine Polityka since 1993.

It is presented in six major categories: literature, film, theatre, classical music, popular music, visual arts (and entertainment up until 2005). In 2002 a new, seventh category was added: creator of culture while in 2016 the eighth category added was digital culture.

According to the editorial declaration, the award is a distinction for creators who make the fastest progress, surprise with new achievements, their activities bode well in the future and thus deserve care, support and promotion in the world. The award's name was conceived as a symbolic passport to the world's art. It is usually given to relatively young creators, often for outstanding debuts.

List of laureates

See also 

List of European art awards
Nike Award
Silesius Poetry Award
Angelus Award
Wisława Szymborska Award
Polish literature

References

External links
 Award homepage

Awards established in 1993
Polish literary awards
1993 establishments in Poland